Malagurski is a surname. Notable people with the surname include:

Boris Malagurski (born 1988), Serbian-Canadian film director, producer, writer and television presenter
Sanja Malagurski (born 1990), Serbian volleyball player

See also
Mara Đorđević-Malagurski (1894–1971), Serbian writer and ethnographer